Jocelyne Jocya (January 7, 1942 – August 18, 2003) was a French singer, songwriter, and advocate of children's rights best known for her rendition of "Bon Voyage".

From 1958 to 1980, she sold millions of records and performed in the world's most famous music halls. In 1988, she founded the Federation for the Declaration of the Rights of Children, a non-profit children's rights organization.

Biography
Jocya's first big break occurred at the age of 17 when she competed in a talent contest in France entitled "Les Nº 1 de Demain" at the Paris Olympia. She took first place singing her song "Bon Voyage", winning a car, a recording contract, and the attention of Édith Piaf, who presided over the competition. Her recording of "Bon Voyage" catapulted her to superstar status and sold millions of copies around the world. She became the protégé of Piaf and went on to win Le Coq d'Or de la Chanson Française, three times. In the 1970s she wrote produced, wrote and performed in New York City such hits as French Dressings. From 1980–1985 Jocelyn was a client of L'étoile Talent Agencies and CEL Management co-owned by Rob Cipriano. She went on to re-sign with Cipriano in Los Angeles, California where she was a special guest at many events. She created the Foundation For The Declaration Of The Rights of Children, an international children's charity. She performed at the Beverly Wilshire Hotel at the Friends Of Sheba Gala with Larry King, Natalie Cole and the Crenshaw Elite Chore as part of her efforts for children.

Death
She died on August 18, 2003 of breast cancer at the age of 61.

Discography
 1958 – Bon Voyage
 1958 – Les Gitans – Vol. 2
 1958 – Le Coq de la Chanson Française (Compilation)
 1958 – Chanson Parade Vol. 1 (Compilation)
 1959 – Pour Peu Qu'on M'aime – Vol. 3
 1960 – Notre Concerto – Vol. 5
 1960 – N° 20 (Sonorama)
 1960 – L'arlequin de Tolède – Vol. 4
 1961 – Ton Adieu
 1962 – La Plus Haute Colline
 1963 – Tout Se Sait un Jour
 1964 – Il Ne Fallait Pas
 1967 – Comme les Autres
 1970 – Douya Douya
 1980 – Si Tous les Je T'aime

Tours and Performances
 1957 – L'Olympia Musicorama
 1958 – L'Olympia Musicorama
 1958 – Casino Estoril, Portugal
 1959 – Bobino–Guy Beart
 1959 – L'Olympia Musicorama
 1959 – L'Olympia-Marie J Neuville
 1959 – Alcazar de Marseille
 1959 – Bal du Moulin Rouge
 1960 – Alhambra-Discorama
 1960 – Bobino–Darío Moreno
 1960 – Alhambra-Discorama
 1960 – Bobino-Henry Salvador
 1961 – Alhambra-Nicole Croisille
 1962 – A.B.C.-Darío Moreno
 1963 – Alhambra-Discorama
 1964 – Concert Pacra
 1966 – Bobino

References

External links
Official site

1942 births
2003 deaths
Deaths from cancer in California
Children's rights activists
Deaths from breast cancer
French women activists
French women songwriters
People from Greater Los Angeles
Place of birth missing
20th-century French women singers